is a Japanese competitor in synchronized swimming.

She received five Olympic medals at the 1996, 2000 and 2004 Summer Olympics. The silver medal from the 2000 Olympics was in the duet with Miya Tachibana, and they also received a silver medal at the 2004 Olympics.

Miho is a graduate of Ritsumeikan University and the wife of Governor Eikei Suzuki of Mie.

References

External links
 Miho Takeda's official page

1976 births
Living people
Asian Games medalists in artistic swimming
Japanese synchronized swimmers
Olympic bronze medalists for Japan
Olympic medalists in synchronized swimming
Olympic silver medalists for Japan
Olympic synchronized swimmers of Japan
Sportspeople from Kyoto
Ritsumeikan University alumni
Spouses of Japanese politicians
Synchronized swimmers at the 1996 Summer Olympics
Synchronized swimmers at the 2000 Summer Olympics
Synchronized swimmers at the 2004 Summer Olympics
Artistic swimmers at the 1998 Asian Games
Artistic swimmers at the 2002 Asian Games
World Aquatics Championships medalists in synchronised swimming
Synchronized swimmers at the 1998 World Aquatics Championships
Synchronized swimmers at the 1994 World Aquatics Championships
Medalists at the 2004 Summer Olympics
Medalists at the 2000 Summer Olympics
Medalists at the 1996 Summer Olympics
Asian Games gold medalists for Japan
Medalists at the 1998 Asian Games
Medalists at the 2002 Asian Games